Sanjay Kumar (born 15 January 1976) is an Indian social/political activist. He is currently the deputy director of Aashray Adhikar Abhiyan, an organization in New Delhi that has worked for the rights of homeless people since 2000.

Kumar has been working in the fields of social work, social policy and research since 2000. His main focus typically lies on the issues of urban poverty, homelessness, underage employment, street dwelling children, old age pension, right to education, right to food and citizenship rights. Kumar is responsible for managing and implementing a campaign in Delhi with hundreds of volunteers to ensure access to shelters, health-care, skill development, and justice for marginalized people. He has been consistently organizing mass events/rallies, conducting census/surveys, documenting and researching interventions, establishing networks and advocacy groups with government departments, other NGOs, and movements. Kumar has been fighting against social inequality, discrimination and sensitizing civil society for the realization of the larger goal of poor people within India.

Kumar is also associated as a research scholar on the issue of homelessness with the Department of Social Work, University of Delhi.

Education 
He is currently in the pursuit of a PhD in Homelessness from the University of Delhi. He has achieved a MSW (Master of Social Work), UGC, NET, a diploma in Journalism and Mass Communication, a diploma in Rural Development, BA (Honours) and MA in History.

Publications and documentations 
Treatment of Homeless people with severe Mental Illness: Making a Difference
"Begharo Ki Karah" case studies of homeless people 
"Meri Kahani Meri Jubani" The Testimonies of homeless people caught Under Bombay Prevention Of Beggary Act: published in "People Without A Nation" "Towards Reclaiming Our Humanity" - Published by his own NGO Aashray Adhikar Abhiyan

Awards and fellowship 
Sanjay Kumar has received a scholarship for an emerging social entrepreneur from Leader Quest organization situated in London, UK (2007–08). He was also presented with a "True Legend Award" in 2016 by CNBC-TV 18. He has been a member in the Chief Electoral officer, GNCT of Delhi for Homeless people. Additionally, he also holds an award for an actively monitored and guided Night Shelter Volunteer's program (Delhi Urban Shelter Improvement Board) presented to him in 2015. Kumar was also awarded by UBM India Ltd. for the "Giving Back" NGO in 2013 at Mumbai, India.

References

External links

1976 births
Living people
Delhi politicians
Indian human rights activists